Saimir Dauti (born 1943–1944) is a former Albanian football player and coach who spent his entire career at Dinamo Tirana and even managed the side in the late 70s and early 80s.

Club career
When with Dinamo, Dauti topped Albania's goalscoring charts in 1966 with 13 goals.

Personal life
His brother Lulzim was also a professional footballer in the 60s and 70s with Partizani Tirana. During his time as a football player and coach he was commonly referred to as Sallake.

Since around 2007 he has been working for the Albanian Football Association, sitting as a member of the appeals board of the disciplinary commission.

Honours
Albanian Superliga: 1
 1967

References

1943 births
Living people
Footballers from Tirana
Albanian footballers
Association football forwards
FK Dinamo Tirana players
Kategoria Superiore players
Albanian football managers
FK Dinamo Tirana managers
FK Tomori Berat managers